The Inheritors (original German title Die Siebtelbauern – "The Seventh-Part Farmers") is a 1998 Austrian-German film directed by Stefan Ruzowitzky. It stars Simon Schwarz and Sophie Rois and has won numerous awards. The film was selected as the Austrian entry for the Best Foreign Language Film at the 71st Academy Awards, but was not accepted as a nominee.

Plot
In a remote valley in Austria in the early 20th century a curmudgeonly farmer dies. While he was a hard and even abusive taskmaster to his farmhands, he was also hostile to his neighbours. Without family, he left his farm, livestock and belongings to his farmhands, rather than to the church as expected. While three leave, demanding their share, the others stay to run it as a shared venture. Wealthy local farmers, feeling threatened by this subversive example, try to subvert the farm. The film contains graphic violence.

Cast
Simon Schwarz as Lukas Lichtmeß
Sophie Rois as Emmy
Lars Rudolph as Severen
Tilo Prückner as Großknecht
Ulrich Wildgruber as Danninger

See also
 List of submissions to the 71st Academy Awards for Best Foreign Language Film
 List of Austrian submissions for the Academy Award for Best Foreign Language Film

References

External links

1998 films
Austrian drama films
German drama films
Films directed by Stefan Ruzowitzky
Films set in the Alps
1990s German films